Rafael Antonio Niño Munévar  (born 11 December 1949) is a retired Colombian road racing cyclist. He won the Vuelta a Colombia in 1970. After that he became a professional cyclist from 1973 to 1974. He participated in the Giro d'Italia. After one year as a professional he returned to Colombia and set up the Banco Cafetero team of which he was the undisputed leader. With this strong team he dominated the Vuelta a Colombia and the Clásico RCN during the 1970s. He earned the nickname El Niño de Cucaita. He won a record six editions of the Vuelta a Colombia. After he retired he became a technical director of the Colombia professional cycling team, Café de Colombia, that participated in the Tour de France winning several stages during the 1980s.

Major results

1970
 1st  Overall Vuelta a Colombia
1971
 1st  Overall Clásico RCN
 3rd Overall Vuelta a Colombia
1972
 1st Stage 6 Vuelta a Colombia
 2nd Overall Vuelta al Táchira
1st Sprints classification
 3rd Overall Clásico RCN
1973
 1st  Overall Vuelta a Colombia
1st Stages 2 & 6
1975
 1st  Overall Vuelta a Colombia
1st Mountains classification
1st Stages 7, 10 & 12
 1st  Overall Clásico RCN
1st Points classification
1st Mountains classification
1st Combined classification
1st Stages 4 & 5
1976
 1st Stages 3b & 4 Vuelta a Boyacá
1977
 1st  Overall Vuelta a Colombia
1st Points classification
1st Mountains classification
1st Combined classification
1st Stages 1, 7, 10 & 11
 1st  Overall Clásico RCN
1st Points classification
 2nd Overall Vuelta a Cundinamarca
1st Points classification
1st Stages 1 & 6
1978
 1st  Overall Vuelta a Colombia
1st Stage 4
 1st  Overall Clásico RCN
1st Points classification
1st Mountains classification
1st Combined classification
1st Stages 3a & 5
1979
 1st  Overall Clásico RCN
1st Combined classification
1st Stage 4
 4th Overall Vuelta a Colombia
1980
 1st  Overall Vuelta a Colombia
1st Stages 6 & 13
1981
 1st Stage 11 Vuelta a Colombia

References

1949 births
Colombian male cyclists
Living people
Sportspeople from Boyacá Department
20th-century Colombian people